The 2012–13 Valencia CF season was the club's 95th season in existence and its 26th consecutive season in La Liga, the top flight of Spanish football. The season marked the coaching debut of Mauricio Pellegrino, who assumed coaching of the club after the four-year tenure of Unai Emery. Pellegrino was sacked on 1 December and replaced with Ernesto Valverde. Manuel Llorente resigned after almost four years as Valencia president on 5 April 2013.

Players

The numbers are established according to the official website: www.valenciacf.com

From Valencia Mestalla

Out on loan

Detailed squad information

Notes: (d), debut in first team in an official match

Transfers

In 

 

Total expenditure:  €25.8 million

Out 

Total income:  €30 million

Club

Technical staff

Source: Valencia CF Official Website

Statistics

Player statistics

{| class="wikitable sortable" style="text-align: center;"
!width=30|
!width=30|P
!width=110|Name
!width=30|
!width=30|
!width=30|
!width=30|
!width=40|
!width=40|
!width=40|
!width=40|
!width=40|
!width=40|
!width=40|
!width=53 align=left|Notes

Goals for goalkeepers are goals against

Disciplinary record
Includes all competitive matches. The list is sorted by shirt number.

Pre-season and friendlies

Competitions

Overall

Overall friendly trophies

Source: Friendlies

Qualifying for next season competitions

La Liga

League table

Results summary

Results by round

Matches

Copa del Rey

Round of 32

Round of 16

Quarter-finals

UEFA Champions League

Group stage

Note: BATE Borisov played their home matches at Dynama Stadium, Minsk instead of their own Haradski Stadium.

Knockout phase

Round of 16

References

External links 
 Official website 

Spanish football clubs 2012–13 season
2012-13
2012–13 UEFA Champions League participants seasons